Hebrew punctuation is similar to that of English and other Western languages, Modern Hebrew having imported additional punctuation marks from these languages in order to avoid the ambiguities sometimes occasioned by the relative paucity of such symbols in Biblical Hebrew.

Punctuation

Quotation marks

With most printed Hebrew texts from the early 1970s and before, opening quotation marks are low (as in German), and closing ones are high, often going above the letters themselves (as opposed to the gershayim, which is level with the top of letters).

However, this distinction in Hebrew between opening and closing quotation marks has mostly disappeared, and today, quotations are most often punctuated as they are in English (such as ), with both quotation marks high. This is due to the advent of the Hebrew keyboard layout, which lacks the opening quotation mark 〈„〉, as well as to the lack in Hebrew of “smart quotes” in certain word processing programs.

In addition, the quotation mark is often used for the similar looking but different gershayim mark 〈〉, as that too is absent from the Hebrew keyboard.

Period, question mark, exclamation mark, comma
Periods (full stops), question marks, exclamation marks, and commas are used as in English.

A Hebrew period in a traditional serif face usually looks like a tiny tilted square (a diamond; ◊). This is also true for the dot part of the question mark, and exclamation mark.

In Arabic, which is also written from right to left, the question mark 〈〉 is mirrored right-to-left from the English question mark. (Some browsers may display the character in the previous sentence as a forward question mark due to font or text directionality issues.) Hebrew is also written right-to-left, but uses a question mark that appears on the page in the same orientation as the English 〈?〉. Note that Hebrew commas are not mirrored - although that was once suggested (together with mirrored semi-colons, 'capital' letters, etc.) by a 19th century British minister called William Withers Ewbank.

Colon and 
Stemming from Biblical Hebrew, a  〈  〉 is the equivalent of a period, and is used in some writings such as prayer books.

Vertical bar and paseq 

The paseq  〈〉 originates from Biblical Hebrew. As it is not on a standard Hebrew keyboard, a vertical bar 〈|〉 is often used instead. However, it is seldom if ever used in modern Israeli Hebrew, and is not mentioned on the Academy of the Hebrew Language's guide to modern Hebrew punctuation. The height of the paseq depends on the font, but it is generally the same as the letter .

Like much Biblical Hebrew punctuation, the meaning of the paseq is not known, although a number of hypotheses exist. The word itself means "separator", but this name was a medieval innovation by later Jews; the root  does not exist in the Biblical Hebrew canon. James Kennedy, an English hebraist, wrote a book about the paseq in which he hypothesized that it was an ancient mark serving the same purpose as the modern word sic (in non-Latin texts). The Westminster Leningrad Codex contains over 500 paseqs; William Wickes, an influential scholar in this area, divide them into nine classes; Wilhelm Gesenius, drawing on Wickes, divided them into five:

 as a divider between two words which end and begin with the same letters, e.g.  (Shalom, ma)
 between identical or very similar words, e.g.  (the dancer danced)
 between words which are to a high degree contradictory, e.g.  (God, evil)
 between words otherwise liable to be wrongly connected, e.g.
 "and lastly, between heterogeneous terms, as Eleazar the High Priest, and Joshua" (see context in )

Hyphen and maqaf

The  〈〉 is the Hebrew hyphen 〈-〉, and has virtually the same purpose for connecting two words as in English.

The original purpose of the maqaf was to show that two words should be considered one for the purpose of dagesh placement, vowels, stress (ṭaʿam), and cantillation. The  is well-used in Hebrew typography; most books and newspapers use it and have the hyphens higher than one would find in English. In typed documents, however, it is frequently not used because before the 2010s it was absent from most keyboards or cumbersome to type. As a consequence, a standard English hyphen 〈-〉 is most often used in online writings. This situation can be compared to that of users writing in Latin alphabets using the easily available hyphen-minus 〈-〉 over hyphen 〈‐〉, minus 〈−〉, en dash 〈–〉, and em dash 〈—〉.

As of 2010s, it is possible to insert  using in most common operating systems: AltGr-Minus in desktop Linux and Windows 8 and higher according to the SI 1452 standard, Option key + Backslash on MacOS, and long tap on the minus in the iOS Hebrew keyboard and in Gboard on Android systems.

Brackets/parentheses
Brackets or parentheses, 〈(〉 and 〈)〉 are the same in Hebrew as in English. Since Hebrew is written from right to left, 〈)〉 becomes an opening bracket, and 〈(〉 a closing bracket, the opposite from English, which is written left to right.

Israeli currency

The shekel sign is the currency sign for the Israeli currency (the Israeli new shekel), in the way $, £, and € exist for other currencies. The shekel sign, like the dollar sign 〈$〉, is usually placed to the left of the number (so , rather than ), but since Hebrew is written from right to left, the symbol is actually written after the number. It is either not separated from the preceding number, or is separated only by a thin space.

"new shekel"). The new shekel sign can be typed on desktop Linux and Windows 8 and higher systems using the combination AltGr-4 according to the SI 1452 standard.

As prices changed so rapidly, advertising of the time predominately used dollars; when the shekel was referred to at all, it was with the letter S or its full Hebrew name—; although certain banks, such as Bank Leumi, used the letter  to refer to it on checks, as well as the Latin letters "I.S."

The Israeli pound was the Israeli Currency until 1980.

Geresh and gershayim

The geresh 〈〉, is the Hebrew equivalent of a period in abbreviations (e.g. abbrev.), in addition to being attached to Hebrew letters to indicate sounds like soft g  and ch  in foreign names such as Charles and Jake. The gershayim 〈〉, is a Hebrew symbol indicating that a sequence of characters is an acronym, and is placed before the last character of the word. Owing to a Hebrew keyboard's having neither a geresh nor gershayim, they are usually replaced online with, respectively, the  visually similar apostrophe 〈'〉 and quotation mark 〈"〉. The quotation mark and apostrophe are higher than the geresh and gershayim: where the latter are placed level with the top of Hebrew letters, the apostrophe and quotation marks are above them.

Some Hebrew-specific fonts (fonts designed primarily for Hebrew letters), such as David, Narkisim and FrankRuehl, do not feature the apostrophe and quotation marks as such but use the geresh and gershayim to substitute for them.

Mathematics
Mathematical expressions are written in Hebrew using the same symbols as in English, including Western numerals, which are written left to right. The only variant that exists is an alternative plus sign, which is a plus sign which looks like an inverted capital T. Unicode has this symbol at position U+FB29 "Hebrew letter alternative plus sign" (﬩). The reason for this practice is that it avoids the writing of a symbol "+" that looks like a Christian cross.

Reversed nun

Reversed nun (also called inverted nun, nun hafukha, or nun menuzzeret) is a rare character found in two Biblical Hebrew texts. Although in Judaic literature it is known as nun hafukha ("reversed nun"), it does not function as any sort of letter in the text. It is not part of a word, and it is not read aloud in any way. It is simply a mark that is written, and is therefore a punctuation mark, not a letter. Also, it is surrounded by space.

While it depends on the particular manuscript or printed edition, it is found in nine places: twice in the Book of Numbers (prior to and after Numbers 10:34-36), and seven times in Psalm 107. It is uncertain today what it was intended to signify.

In many manuscripts, it does not even resemble a transformed nun at all, and when it does, it sometimes appears reversed (as mentioned above), sometimes inverted, and sometimes turned through 180°. Other times it appears to look like the letter Z.

Hebrew points (vowels)

These signs (points) indicate voweling or some other aspects of the pronunciation of a letter or word. While in Modern Hebrew they are not generally used outside poetry and children's books, a vowel point or other diacritic is occasionally added to resolve ambiguity.

Hebrew cantillation marks

{| align="right" class="wikitable"
 | colspan="2" | {{center|1='Example (Genesis 1:1-5)}}
 |-
 | |-
 | align="center" style="background:white;height:50px;width:300px"|
|-
 | |-
 | align="center" style="background:white;height:50px;width:300px"|
|-
|  |-
 | align="center" style="background:white;height:50px;width:300px"|
 |}
The cantillation marks ( '') have a very specialized use.  They are only found in printed Hebrew texts of Tanakh to be used as a guide for chanting the text, either from the printed text or, in the case of the public reading of the Torah, to be memorized along with vowel marks as the Sefer Torah includes only the letters of the text without cantillation or vowel marks. Outside the Tanakh, the cantillation marks are not used in modern spoken or written Hebrew at all. The cantillation marks provide a structure to sentences of Tanakh similar to that provided by punctuation marks.

See also
 Hebrew keyboard
 Hebrew spelling

Notes

References 

Hebrew alphabet
Modern Hebrew
Punctuation of specific languages